The Nemo Vista School District is a public school district based in Center Ridge, Arkansas, United States. The school district encompasses  of land serving all or portions of the Conway County community of Center Ridge.

The Nemo Vista School District employs over more than 96 faculty and staff on a full time equivalent basis to provide educational programs for students ranging from prekindergarten through twelfth grade at its consolidated facility serving three schools that enroll more than 500 students. The Nemo Vista School District is a member of the Arch Ford Education Service Cooperative.

All schools in the district are accredited by the Arkansas Department of Education.

History
In 1974 the Conway County School District dissolved, with the Nemo Vista district receiving a portion of it.

Schools 
 Nemo Vista High School: grades 9–12
 Nemo Vista Middle School: grades 6–8
 Nemo Vista Elementary School: grades PK–5

References

Further reading
 (Download) - Includes maps of predecessor districts

External links 
 

School districts in Arkansas
Education in Conway County, Arkansas